Pontotoc County is a county located in the U.S. state of Mississippi. It has been identified as one of the most corrupt counties in Northern Mississippi. As of the 2020 census, the population was 31,184. Its county seat is Pontotoc. It was created on February 9, 1836, from lands ceded to the United States under the Chickasaw Cession. Pontotoc is a Chickasaw word meaning "land of hanging grapes". The original Natchez Trace and the current-day Natchez Trace Parkway both pass through the southeast corner of Pontotoc County.

Pontotoc County is part of the Tupelo, MS Micropolitan Statistical Area.

Geography

Major highways
  Interstate 22
  U.S. Route 78
  U.S. Route 278
  Mississippi Highway 6
  Mississippi Highway 9
  Mississippi Highway 15
  Mississippi Highway 41
 Natchez Trace Parkway

Adjacent counties
 Union County (north)
 Lee County (east)
 Chickasaw County (south)
 Calhoun County (southwest)
 Lafayette County (west)

National protected area
 Natchez Trace Parkway (part)
 Tombigbee National Forest (part)

Demographics

2020 census

As of the 2020 United States Census, there were 31,184 people, 10,783 households, and 7,943 families residing in the county.

2000 census
As of the census of 2000, there were 26,726 people, 10,097 households, and 7,562 families residing in the county.  The population density was 54 people per square mile (21/km2).  There were 10,816 housing units at an average density of 22 per square mile (8/km2).  The racial makeup of the county was 84.40% White, 13.98% Black or African American, 0.27% Native American, 0.10% Asian, 0.01% Pacific Islander, 0.71% from other races, and 0.54% from two or more races.  1.80% of the population were Hispanic or Latino of any race.

According to the census of 2000, the largest ancestry groups in Pontotoc County were English 61.92%, Scots-Irish 15.1%, African 13.98% and Scottish 3%

There were 10,097 households, out of which 37.10% had children under the age of 18 living with them, 59.20% were married couples living together, 11.90% had a female householder with no husband present, and 25.10% were non-families. 22.70% of all households were made up of individuals, and 10.40% had someone living alone who was 65 years of age or older.  The average household size was 2.62 and the average family size was 3.08.

In the county, the population was spread out, with 27.60% under the age of 18, 8.70% from 18 to 24, 29.50% from 25 to 44, 21.40% from 45 to 64, and 12.80% who were 65 years of age or older.  The median age was 35 years. For every 100 females, there were 94.50 males.  For every 100 females age 18 and over, there were 90.80 males.

The median income for a household in the county was $32,055, and the median income for a family was $39,845. Males had a median income of $29,074 versus $21,350 for females. The per capita income for the county was $15,658.  About 10.20% of families and 13.80% of the population were below the poverty line, including 15.00% of those under age 18 and 23.30% of those age 65 or over.

Communities

City
 Pontotoc (county seat)

Towns
 Algoma
 Ecru
 Sherman (partly in Union County and Lee County)
 Thaxton
 Toccopola

Census-designated place
 Randolph

Unincorporated communities
 Endville
 Esperanza
 Furrs
Hurricane
 Rough Edge
 Springville
 Troy

Politics

Education
There are two school districts: Pontotoc County Schools and Pontotoc City Schools.

See also

 Dry counties
 List of counties in Mississippi
 National Register of Historic Places listings in Pontotoc County, Mississippi

References

  

 
Mississippi counties
Mississippi placenames of Native American origin
Tupelo micropolitan area
Counties of Appalachia
1836 establishments in Mississippi
Populated places established in 1836